Beta-catenin-like protein 1 is a protein that in humans is encoded by the CTNNBL1 gene.

The protein encoded by this gene contains an acidic domain, a putative bipartite nuclear localization signal, a nuclear export signal, a leucine-isoleucine zipper, and phosphorylation motifs. In addition, the encoded protein contains Armadillo/beta-catenin-like repeats, which have been implicated in protein-protein interactions. Although the function of this protein has not been determined, the C-terminal portion of the protein has been shown to possess apoptosis-inducing activity. It is a housekeeping gene.

References

External links

Further reading

Armadillo-repeat-containing proteins